The Karaliaus Mindaugo taurė MVP is an award that is annually handed out to the most valuable player, in a given tournament, of the Karaliaus Mindaugo taurė professional basketball Lithuanian national domestic cup competition. The award was introduced when the competition was first held, in 2016. Antanas Kavaliauskas was the inaugural winner of the award.

Winners

Awards won by nationality

Awards won by club

See also
LKL
LKL MVP
LKL Finals
LKL Finals MVP
King Mindaugas Cup
LKF Cup

References

External links 
 Official LKL website
 Official LKL YouTube.com channel
 Lithuanian league at Eurobasket.com

Karaliaus Mindaugo taurė